Markholm Construction Co Ltd v Wellington City Council [1985] 2 NZLR 520 is a cited case in New Zealand regarding contract formation.

Background
The Wellington City Council had advertised sections for sale by ballot in a new subdivision. After finding this ballot heavily oversubscribed, the council realised that the sections had been significantly undervalued.

As a result, the council refused to go through with the ballot, and cancelled the ballot.

The Markholm's sued the council for specific performance for the contract - to go through with the sale of the sections by ballot.

Held
The court ruled it was a legally binding contract. However, the court refused to order specific performance given the odds of winning in the ballot, and damages instead were awarded.

References

High Court of New Zealand cases
New Zealand contract case law
1984 in case law
1984 in New Zealand law